Kim Eun-jeong (born 7 May 1973) is a South Korean swimmer. She competed in three events at the 1988 Summer Olympics.

References

External links
 

1973 births
Living people
South Korean female freestyle swimmers
Olympic swimmers of South Korea
Swimmers at the 1988 Summer Olympics
Place of birth missing (living people)
Asian Games medalists in swimming
Asian Games silver medalists for South Korea
Swimmers at the 1990 Asian Games
Medalists at the 1990 Asian Games
20th-century South Korean women